Montgomery Central High School is a high school located in Cunningham, Tennessee, an unincorporated suburban community outside Clarksville. It is part of the Clarksville-Montgomery County School System. It has a GreatSchools rating of 8 out of 10. The Montgomery Central Middle School is situated on an adjacent site.

The school building was completed around 1970. It is an unusual structure situated on a man-made lake and featuring concrete shell construction. Major renovations and an expansion were begun in 2010 that would maintain and enhance the forty-year-old pod structures. The project is funded with an interest free bond administered under the American Recovery and Reinvestment Act of 2009.

Controversy
In May 2016, the school became the focus of a national controversy when a special-needs autistic student was not able to attend the school's prom with his sister, an alum of Montgomery Central.  The sister was 24 years of age, over the age limit of 20 years old.

References

Public high schools in Tennessee
Schools in Montgomery County, Tennessee